Joktheel is a geographic name used in the Hebrew Bible, meaning "God-subdued".

In Judah
A place named Joktheel is mentioned in the Book of Joshua and the {Book of 2 Kings in chapter 14, verse }] as located in the low country of Judah between Mizpah and Lachish.

In Edom (Sela)
A different place, located in Edom and originally called Sela, is renamed as Joktheel by King Amaziah of Judah after his conquest of the area. The Second Book of Chronicles offers a clearer explanation of how that name, which means "God-subdued", was chosen due to the fact that Amaziah attributed his victory to God.

References

Hebrew Bible places